Ganjeh may refer to:

Azerbaijan
 Ganja, Azerbaijan

Iran
 Ganjeh, Fars
 Ganjeh, Gilan
 Ganjeh, Hamadan
 Ganjeh, Ilam
 Ganjeh, Isfahan
 Ganjeh, Kohgiluyeh and Boyer-Ahmad